is a Japanese football player. He plays for Arterivo Wakayama.

Career
Shota Hayashi joined J2 League club Roasso Kumamoto in 2017.

Club statistics
Updated to 22 February 2018.

References

External links
Profile at Roasso Kumamoto

1995 births
Living people
Kokushikan University alumni
Association football people from Kyoto Prefecture
Japanese footballers
J2 League players
Roasso Kumamoto players
Arterivo Wakayama players
Association football forwards